The Tides of Barnegat is a 1917 American drama silent film directed by Marshall Neilan and written by Francis Hopkinson Smith and Eve Unsell. The film stars Blanche Sweet, Elliott Dexter, Tom Forman, Norma Nichols, Billy Jacobs and Walter Rodgers. The film was released on April 12, 1917, by Paramount Pictures.

Plot

Cast 
Blanche Sweet as Jane Cobden
Elliott Dexter as Dr. John Cavendish
Tom Forman as Barton Holt
Norma Nichols as Lucy Cobden
Billy Jacobs as Archie
Walter Rodgers as Captain Nathan Holt
Harrison Ford as Sidney Gray
Lillian Leighton as Martha Lillian

References

External links 
 
 
 portrait of scene(archived)

1917 films
1910s English-language films
Silent American drama films
1917 drama films
Paramount Pictures films
Films directed by Marshall Neilan
American black-and-white films
American silent feature films
Films based on American novels
1910s American films